Claire Lois Stewart  (17 June 1941 – 29 March 2020) was a New Zealand politician who served as mayor of New Plymouth from 1992 until 2001. She was the first woman to hold this position.

Biography
Stewart was born on 17 June 1941. In 1961 she married JJ Stewart, a high school teacher and rugby coach eighteen years her senior and a drinking mate of her father. By the time she was 28, they had five children together.

Stewart was elected to the New Plymouth District Council in 1989. She also served on the Taranaki Regional Council and the Taranaki District Health Board. In 1992, she was elected mayor. During her time in office she extended the New Plymouth Coastal Walkway, built a domestic violence shelter, and began the process of building Puke Ariki. In 2000, she was considered a frontrunner to be elected president of Local Government New Zealand, but the position was ultimately filled by Basil Morrison, the mayor of Hauraki. She retired in 2001 to look after her husband who was ill. He died the next year.

In the 2002 New Year Honours, Stewart was appointed a Companion of the Queen's Service Order for public services. In 2010, she moved to the Shire of Noosa in Australia to be closer to family. Stewart died at her nursing home in Tewantin on 29 March 2020 after a long illness, one day after her daughter-in-law, also named Clare Stewart, was elected mayor of Noosa. After two years of delay due to the COVID-19 pandemic, a memorial service in New Plymouth is planned for 17 June 2022.

References

1941 births
2020 deaths
Mayors of New Plymouth
Women mayors of places in New Zealand
Taranaki regional councillors
Taranaki District Health Board members
Companions of the Queen's Service Order
New Zealand justices of the peace